NOV (nephroblastoma overexpressed) also known as CCN3 is a matricellular protein that in humans is encoded by the NOV gene.

CCN family 

NOV is a member of the CCN family of secreted, extracellular matrix (ECM)-associated signaling proteins (see also CCN intercellular signaling protein). The CCN acronym is derived from the first three members of the family being identified, namely CYR61 (cysteine-rich angiogenic inducer 61, or CCN1), CTGF (connective tissue growth factor, or CCN2), and NOV. These proteins, together with WISP1 (CCN4), WISP2 (CCN5), and WISP3 (CCN6) comprise the six-member CCN family in vertebrates and have been renamed CCN1-6 in the order of their discovery by international consensus.

Structure 

The human NOV protein contains 357 amino acids with an N-terminal secretory signal peptide followed by four structurally distinct domains with homologies to insulin-like growth factor binding protein (IGFBP), von Willebrand type C repeats (vWC), thrombospondin type 1 repeat (TSR), and a cysteine knot motif within the C-terminal (CT) domain.

Function 

NOV regulates multiple cellular activities including cell adhesion, migration, proliferation, differentiation, and survival. It functions by direct binding to integrin receptors, as well as other receptors such as NOTCH1 and fibulin 1c (FBLN1).
NOV is expressed during wound healing and induces angiogenesis in vivo. It is essential for self-renewal of CD34+ hematopoietic stem cells from umbilical cord blood.

NOV can bind BMP2 and inhibit its functions in promoting osteogenic differentiation, and stimulate osteoclastogenesis through a process that may involve calcium flux. Overexpression of Nov in transgenic mice in osteoblasts antagonizes both BMP and Wnt-signaling and result in osteopenia.

In February 2017, it was reported that the NOV protein was involved in regulatory T cell-mediated oligodendrocyte differentiation in the regeneration of myelin following damage to the myelin sheath. This finding revealed a new function for regulatory T cells that is distinct from their role in immunomodulation. NOV (CCN3) has recently been implicated in mood disorders, notably in the postpartum period; these effects may be mediated by its effects on myelination

Role in embryo development 

In contrast to the lethality of Cyr61 (CCN1) and Ctgf (CCN2) genetic knockout in mice, Nov-null mice are viable and largely normal, exhibiting only modest and transient sexually dimorphic skeletal abnormalities. However, Nov-null mice show enhanced blood vessel neointimal thickening when challenged with vascular injury, indicating that NOV inhibits neoinitimal hyperplasia.

Role in cancer 

Although NOV inhibits the proliferation of cancer cells, it appears to promote metastasis. Nov overexpression results in reduced tumor size in glioma cells xenografts, but enhances metastatic potential in xenotransplanted melanoma cells. NOV expression is associated with a higher risk of metastasis and worse prognosis in patients with cancers such as Ewing's sarcoma, melanoma, and breast cancer. In chronic myeloid leukemia (CML), NOV is downregulated as a consequence of the kinase activity of BCR-ABL, a chimeric protein generated through the chromosomal translocation between chromosome 9 and 22. Forced expression of NOV inhibits proliferation and restores growth control in CML cells, suggesting that NOV may be an alternate target for novel therapeutics against CML.

References 

CCN proteins